Saleh Allahyar (Arabic:صالح اللهيار) (born 26 November 1980) in Senegal is a retired Qatari of Senegalese descent who was a footballer.

External links
 

Qatari footballers
1980 births
Living people
Al-Shamal SC players
Al-Wakrah SC players
Umm Salal SC players
Qatar Stars League players
Qatari Second Division players
Association football goalkeepers